The EMD DDA40X is a 6,600 hp (4,943 kW) D-D locomotive, built by EMD from 1969 to 1971 exclusively for the Union Pacific Railroad. It is the most powerful diesel-electric locomotive model ever built on a single frame, having two 16-645E3A diesel prime movers. Union Pacific has marked DD40X on the cab exteriors, while EMD literature inconsistently refers to this model as either DD-40X or DDA40X. 

UP's DDA40X locomotives were the ultimate culmination of the company's experiments with extremely powerful locomotives that began with its gas turbine-electric locomotives and DD35s. For manufacturer EMD, the construction of the world's most powerful single frame locomotive was a sign of the company's dominance of the North American diesel locomotive market, with only GE Transportation an equal competitor. The DDA40X also pioneered a number of new technologies that would go on to be incorporated in future EMD designs.

Ultimately, UP did not continue with exceptionally powerful locomotives like the DDA40X built on single frames, instead moving towards distributed power using smaller locomotives closer to 4,000 hp. All of DDA40X locomotives were retired between 1984 and 1986; several of them survive. Union Pacific 6936 operated as a member of the Union Pacific Heritage Fleet until 2022, when it was announced it would be donated to the Railroading Heritage of Midwest America museum.

History

In 1969, Union Pacific was retiring the last of their gas turbine-electric locomotives. Beginning in 1963, Union Pacific had ordered EMD DD35s and DD35As to replace the turbines, and the DDA40X was a further development from this design.

The first DDA40X, UP 6900, was delivered in April 1969, in time to participate in the celebrations of the centennial anniversary of the completion of the first transcontinental railroad driving the "Gold Spike Limited"; it arrived in Salt Lake City, Utah, on the morning of May 10, 1969. In honor of this, the class was nicknamed Centennials and the choice of locomotive numbers in the 6900s was made for the same reason. Forty-six more were built between June 1969 and September 1971, numbered from 6901 to 6946.

The frames were fabricated by the John Mohr Company of Chicago, because they were too large for EMD's factory. The use of more than one prime mover in a single locomotive was not new; the E-series were popular dual-engine locomotives, and Baldwin had produced (but not sold) a locomotive with four diesel engines.

The "X" in the model number stood for experimental, as DDA40X Centennials were testbeds for technology that would go into future EMD products. UP frequently used these locomotives to haul heavy freights. Each unit successfully ran about  before they were retired from revenue service in 1985. The modular electronic control systems, later used in EMD Dash-2 models, were first used on the DDA40X and the 4,200 hp SD45X. All DDA40X units included a new load test circuit, whose dynamic braking resistors allowed units to load test without a track-side load test box. Gearing was 59:18, allowing  on freight trains.

The DDA40X has a wide nose akin to those on the F45 and FP45 cowl units. These cabs were superficially similar to the Canadian comfort cab introduced by Canadian National in 1973, though without the structural reinforcements of the Canadian design.

Other experiments were conducted during the service life of these locomotives. A few of the units were fitted with Federal Signal Thunderbolt air raid sirens to warn track-side personnel when away from grade crossings, but the results were inconclusive. Another test included the modular electrical components, which was successful. This made for easier diagnosis of electrical problems. These modifications were used in all future locomotives built by EMD.

Despite their excellent performance and relatively good efficiency, these units were costly to maintain, which ultimately prompted Union Pacific to begin placing them into storage in the early 1980s. But in early 1984, as rail traffic rebounded, Union Pacific brought 25 units out of storage and rebuilt them to return to service. All locomotives were finally retired by 1986. Eleven DDA40X units are preserved by various museums, while another unit survives as a source of spare parts for other locomotives. UP 6936, the last operating unit, was owned by Union Pacific and was used in excursion service until 2016. In 2022, this locomotive was donated by Union Pacific to the Railroading Heritage of Midwest America, which plans to return the locomotive to operation.

Surviving examples

Thirteen DDA40Xs survive today. The following list details the surviving locomotives and their current owners.
 6900 - Kenefick Park, Omaha, Nebraska. The first DDA40X built.
 6901 - Ross Park, Pocatello, Idaho.
 6911 - Mexico Museum of Technology, Mexico City.
 6913 - Museum of the American Railroad, Frisco, Texas.
 6915 - RailGiants Train Museum, Fairplex, Pomona, California.
 6916 - Utah State Railroad Museum, Ogden, Utah.
 6922 - Cody Park, North Platte, Nebraska.
 6925 - Stored at Dakota Southern Railway’s rail yard located in Chamberlain, South Dakota, having been used as a parts source and for fuel storage. It was owned by the Nebraska Railroad Museum, until October 2022, when it was sold to a private owner in Kansas City.
 6930 - Illinois Railway Museum, Union, Illinois. Originally donated to Smoky Hill Railway & Historical Society (Kansas City area); traded and moved to the IRM in 1991.
 6936 - Railroading Heritage of Midwest America, Silvis, Illinois. Previously operated as part of the UP Heritage Fleet until 2016.
 6938 - North Little Rock, Arkansas. Sits in front of Jenks Locomotive Facility.
 6944 - National Museum of Transportation, St. Louis, Missouri. No. 6944 was sent to Altoona in July, 2014 for cosmetic restoration, which was completed in May, 2015. The locomotive returned to St. Louis in June, 2015.
 6946 - Western Pacific Railroad Museum, Portola, California. The last DDA40X built, it is fairly complete and on static display.

See also
 EMD DD35
 EMD DD35A
 EMD DDM45

References

 Union Pacific Railroad Locomotive Department (1979). Locomotive Diagram Book. Union Pacific Railroad Company.
 Union Pacific Railroad Locomotive Department (1994). Locomotive Diagram Book. Union Pacific Railroad Company.

External links

 EMD DDA40X Dimensions
 Union Pacific Centennials (DDA40X)
 Union Pacific DDA40X Centennial 6922 October 20 1984

Diesel-electric locomotives of the United States
DDA40X
D-D locomotives
Union Pacific Railroad locomotives
Railway locomotives introduced in 1969
Freight locomotives
Standard gauge locomotives of the United States